Raul Axente Ciupe (born 24 November 1983) is a Romanian former footballer who played as a right back or midfielder for teams such as Sportul Studențesc, Universitatea Cluj or  Sănătatea Cluj, among others.

Career
After playing for Gaz Metan Mediaș in Divizia B, Ciupe made his top-flight debut on 31 July 2004 as a Sportul Studențesc player, in a match against Unirea Alba-Iulia.

Playing for the Romania national under-21 football team in a match against Macedonia, he was fouled by Goran Popov and suffered a broken tibia. Minutes earlier, another Macedonian player, Hristijan Kirovski, was sent off after also fouling Ciupe. The right-back completely missed the 2005–2006 season because of the injury.

Ciupe played seven years for Sportul Studențesc before joining FC Brașov in November 2011. In June 2012 he was transferred by his hometown team Universitatea Cluj for whom he managed to score his first goals in Liga I, against Astra Ploiești and the local rivals from CFR Cluj.

References

External links
 Profile on Universitatea Cluj official site
 
 

Living people
1984 births
Sportspeople from Cluj-Napoca
Romanian footballers
Association football defenders
Liga I players
Liga II players
Liga III players
CS Gaz Metan Mediaș players
FC Sportul Studențesc București players
FC Brașov (1936) players
FC Universitatea Cluj players
FC Viitorul Constanța players